Anthony Paul Ramos Martinez (born November 1, 1991) is an American actor and singer. In 2015, he originated the dual roles of John Laurens and Philip Hamilton in the Broadway musical Hamilton. Ramos also appeared in the 2021 film version of In the Heights as Usnavi and in the 2018 film A Star Is Born as Ramon. In 2021, he received a nomination for a Primetime Emmy Award for Outstanding Actor in a Supporting Role in a Limited Series or Movie for his performance in the Disney+ live stage recording of Hamilton which was released in 2020. He is scheduled to star in Transformers: Rise of the Beasts in 2023.

Early life and education
Ramos was born Anthony Paul Ramos Martinez in New York City, and is of Puerto Rican descent. He grew up in the Bushwick, Brooklyn neighborhood where he lived with his mother, older brother, and younger sister.

Ramos attended Halsey Junior High School, where he sang Motown songs at school assemblies in a student group called the Halsey Trio. He is a 2009 graduate of New Utrecht High School. His ambitions at the time centered around baseball, including plans to play NCAA Division III college baseball, followed by a coaching career.

After high school, Ramos attended the American Musical and Dramatic Academy, a conservatory for the performing arts, on a full scholarship. He graduated from its musical theatre program in 2011.

Acting career
Starting in 2011, Ramos earned roles in a variety of regional and touring musical productions, including Usnavi de la Vega in a 2012 production of In the Heights.

In 2014, Ramos performed in Heart and Lights at Radio City Music Hall, a dance show with the Rockettes which was canceled during previews. During rehearsals for Heart and Lights, Ramos auditioned for the off-Broadway production of Hamilton at The Public Theater.

After being cast in Hamilton, Ramos played Justin Laboy in Lin-Manuel Miranda's short musical 21 Chump Street, a 14-minute, one-time performance on June 7, 2014, that was recorded for This American Life.

Hamilton opened off-Broadway in early 2015, with Ramos originating the dual roles of John Laurens and Alexander Hamilton's eldest son Philip Hamilton.  The musical moved to Broadway on July 13, 2015, in previews, and opened on August 6, 2015. Ramos left the production on November 20, 2016.

In September 2016, it was announced that Ramos had been cast in director Spike Lee's Netflix comedy-drama series She's Gotta Have It, in the role of Mars Blackmon.

Ramos played the role of Ramon in the 2018 remake of A Star Is Born, starring Lady Gaga and Bradley Cooper, and directed by Cooper.

In 2018, Variety reported that Ramos had been cast as Usnavi de la Vega in the film adaptation of In the Heights. The movie was released in 2021 to significant acclaim, but was a box-office bomb.

In April 2021, Ramos was cast in the lead role in the next installment of the Transformers film franchise, Transformers: Rise of the Beasts. The film is currently scheduled to be released in 2023.

In February 2022, Ramos was cast in a key role in the upcoming superhero streaming series Ironheart, set in the Marvel Cinematic Universe.

Recording career
Ramos appeared on the original Broadway cast recording of Hamilton in 2015, in the dual roles of John Laurens and Philip Hamilton.
He reunited with Lin-Manuel Miranda in October 2017 as one of the vocalists on Miranda's song "Almost Like Praying", a release to benefit Hurricane Maria victims.

On November 8, 2017, Ramos released two tracks, "Freedom" and "Common Ground", from  solo EP, titled The Freedom EP. The release was produced by Will Wells, who had previously worked with Logic and Pentatonix. Inspired by the 2016 election, The Freedom EP was released on the first anniversary of President Donald Trump's inauguration, January 20, 2018. In addition to the previously released singles "Freedom", "Common Ground", and "Alright", the EP included two new songs, "When The Bell Tolls" and "PRayer" .

On June 13, 2019, it was announced that Ramos had signed to Republic Records. The signing was documented on his YouTube series, It Takes A Village, where he revealed that new music would be released that summer. His debut album, The Good & The Bad, was released on October 25, 2019. It debuted at number 21 on the US Billboard Heatseekers Albums chart.

On June 25, 2021, Ramos released his second album Love and Lies.

Personal life
Starting in 2014, Ramos began a relationship with actress Jasmine Cephas Jones, whom he met during rehearsals for the Off-Broadway production of Hamilton. On Christmas Eve 2018, the couple became engaged. In November 2021, it was reported that the couple ended their engagement.

Filmography

Film

Television

Theatre

Discography

Studio albums

Extended plays

Soundtrack and cast albums

Singles

Awards and nominations

References

External links
 
 
 

1990 births
American impressionists (entertainers)
American male voice actors
21st-century American male actors
American male film actors
American male musical theatre actors
American male singers
American male stage actors
American male television actors
American people of Puerto Rican descent
Grammy Award winners
Living people
Male actors from New York City
People from Bushwick, Brooklyn
Puerto Rican male stage actors
Singers from New York City
New Utrecht High School alumni
American Musical and Dramatic Academy alumni